Fergus Stewart Ewing (born 23 September 1957) is a Scottish National Party (SNP) politician who served as the Scottish Government's Cabinet Secretary for Rural Economy from 2016 to 2021, having previously held two junior ministerial posts. He has been a Member of the Scottish Parliament (MSP) since 1999: for Inverness East, Nairn and Lochaber from 1999 to 2011, and for Inverness and Nairn since 2011.

Background 
Ewing is the son of the veteran Scottish nationalist Winnie Ewing, who served as a Member of Parliament (MP) in the House of Commons, as a Member of the European Parliament (MEP), and an MSP. His father was an SNP local councillor.  He has long been active in the Scottish National Party.

Educated at Loretto School, in Musselburgh, he read Law at the University of Glasgow where he was a member of the Glasgow University Scottish Nationalist Association. His late wife, Margaret Ewing, was the MSP for the neighbouring constituency of Moray until her death from breast cancer in March 2006. His sister, Annabelle Ewing, was the Member of Parliament (MP) for Perth until the 2005 general election and has been the MSP for Mid Scotland and Fife since 2011.

He is now in a relationship with Dr. Fiona Pearsall with whom he had a daughter in 2008.

Member of the Scottish Parliament 

Ewing was elected to represent Inverness East, Nairn and Lochaber in the Scottish Parliament in 1999 and he held on to the seat in 2003 and 2007.

He, with his mother Winnie Ewing, abstained from the vote to abolish Section 28 via the Ethical Standards in Public Life etc. (Scotland) Act 2000; he also opposed an outright ban on fox hunting. After the SNP's victory at the 2007 Scottish Parliament Election, Ewing was appointed as the Minister for Community Safety. After the SNP victory at the 2011 Scottish Parliament Election, he was appointed as the Minister for Energy, Enterprise and Tourism, succeeding Jim Mather who stood down as an MSP. In February 2014 he voted against the legalisation of same-sex marriage in Scotland. In November 2014 the portfolio became Business Energy & Tourism.

In 2019 civil servants complained to senior managers that Ewing had bullied them. Speaking to journalists Ewing said: "I completely reject all claims against me. A process is underway and that is entirely right and proper when such allegations are made. That process is at an early stage. I will make no further comment while that process is ongoing." The previous year Ewing apologised to an official for his "forthright" manner, after a bullying complaint was lodged against him.

After the 2021 election Ewing was replaced as a minister by Mairi Gougeon and became a backbencher. In a public letter to First Minister Nicola Sturgeon, Ewing revealed: "In our discussion yesterday, you indicated that you will form a slimmed down cabinet. Obviously, you have had to make some tough decisions and we agreed that this meant I should now step out of Government."

In 2022 Ewing backed new oil and gas exploration and drilling projects in the North Sea, claiming that "we need all oil and gas production we can get in the short and the medium term", and that "the transition period away from hydrocarbons will last decades." Hence, he condemned the Scottish Greens, the SNP's government partners, whose policies he described as "somewhat extreme".

References

External links
 
Fergus Ewing.com Official Website

1957 births
Living people
Alumni of the University of Glasgow
People educated at Loretto School, Musselburgh
Politicians from Glasgow
Scottish National Party MSPs
Members of the Scottish Cabinet
Members of the Scottish Parliament 1999–2003
Members of the Scottish Parliament 2003–2007
Members of the Scottish Parliament 2007–2011
Members of the Scottish Parliament 2011–2016
Members of the Scottish Parliament 2016–2021
Members of the Scottish Parliament 2021–2026
Scottish solicitors